Florence is a suburb of Stoke-on-Trent, in the Stoke-on-Trent district, in the ceremonial county of Staffordshire, England. It is near Meir. Florence Colliery was built in 1874, and demolished in 1994. Florence became a civil parish in 1894, being formed from the part of Trentham parish in Longton Municipal Borough. On 1 April 1896 the parish was abolished and merged with Longton.

References

Areas of Stoke-on-Trent
Former civil parishes in Staffordshire